Andrei Speriatu (born 29 September 1957) is a Romanian former professional footballer who played as a goalkeeper. Speriatu is considered a legend of FC Argeș Pitești and Sportul Studențesc, also playing for teams such as: Dinamo București, Shimshon Tel Aviv or Dacia Pitești.

International career
Andrei Speriatu played in 24 matches for Romania, including U21 squad (6 matches), Olympic squad (14 matches) and first squad (4 matches).

International stats

Honours
Argeș Pitești
Divizia A: 1978–79
Balkans Cup runner-up: 1987–88

Dacia Pitești
Divizia C: 1993–94

References

External links
 
 
 
 

1957 births
Living people
People from Giurgiu County
Romanian footballers
Romania under-21 international footballers
Romania international footballers
Association football goalkeepers
Liga I players
FC Argeș Pitești players
FC Dacia Pitești players
FC Dinamo București players
FC Sportul Studențesc București players
Liga Leumit players
Shimshon Tel Aviv F.C. players
Romanian expatriate footballers
Romanian expatriate sportspeople in Israel
Expatriate footballers in Israel
Romanian football managers
FC Sportul Studențesc București managers